The Tutong people are an ethnic group native to Brunei, mainly in Tutong District. They traditionally speak the Tutong language. They are officially recognised as one of the seven ethnic groups of the Bruneian Malay race.

Names 
In Malay, the official language of Brunei, they are called . The Dusun people, another indigenous ethnic group in Brunei, called the Tutong people .

Origin 
The origin of the Tutong people is unclear. According to an oral tradition, they are descended from a Murut named Tutong who had helped the people of Lurah Saban, a village on the banks of the Tutong River, against headhunting by the Kayan people. The river itself is believed to have been named after him in honour of his heroic action. Also, the people whom he had helped eventually considered themselves the followers of Tutong.

Another oral tradition states that they are descended from someone named Si Letong who had migrated from Sulawesi, Indonesia. It was believed that he initially settled in Kampong Telisai and married a local who was a member of the Dusun tribe. It was said that he did not favour living there due to the noise from the sea waves, hence he decided to resettled away from the coast. The river in the new settlement where he lived was eventually named after him, hence the name the Tutong River.

Researchers on the linguistics of Tutong language hypothesise that the Tutong people might have originated from Lower Baram, a region near the mouth of the Baram River in Sarawak, Malaysia. This is based on the cumulative researches which demonstrate the linguistic similarity between the language and Miri language, the language of the people native to the region.

Language 

The Tutong people are the traditional speakers of the Tutong language, an Austronesian language. It is considered endangered. Notable initiatives to revitalise the language include the publication of a bilingual dictionary between Tutong and Malay by Dewan Bahasa dan Pustaka Brunei, the Bruneian language authority, and the introduction of Tutong as a language subject in the national university Universiti Brunei Darussalam.

Population 
The population is recorded to be 16,958 in Brunei.

Religion 
The Tutong people are entirely Muslims. However, in the past, they had practiced animism. The exact point in time when they converted to Islam is not known, however it is thought to be related to the migration of the Muslims from Brunei proper and Sarawak and their marriage with the Tutong locals sometime in the 18th and 19th centuries.

Notes

Citations

References 

 
 
 
 

Ethnic groups in Brunei
Society of Brunei